Nupskapa Peak is an icecapped peak, 2,450 m, just south of Reece Valley in the Sverdrup Mountains, Queen Maud Land. Mapped by Norwegian cartographers from surveys and air photos by Norwegian-British-Swedish Antarctic Expedition (NBSAE) (1949–52). Rephotographed by the Norwegian expedition (1958–59) and named Nupskapa (the peak cloak). Storkvaeven Cirque is a cirque on the northwest side of Nupskapa Peak.

Mountains of Queen Maud Land
Princess Martha Coast